Patrick Carpentier (born August 13, 1971) is a retired Canadian professional auto racing driver. In the Champ Car World Series and the IndyCar Series, he achieved five wins and 24 podiums, as well as two third place championship finishes in 2002 and 2004. The long-time Champ Car driver switched to the IndyCar Series in 2005, and moved on to Grand Am Road Racing in 2007. After a few NASCAR races in 2007, he moved full-time into the series in 2008. Since 2009, he has only had part-time drives, so became a contractor and renovator in Montreal, trading in real estate in Las Vegas, as well as being a color commentator for television coverage of various racing series. He last competed part-time in the NASCAR Sprint Cup Series, driving the No. 32 Ford Fusion for Go FAS Racing. Carpentier is now the president of a home construction firm in Quebec.

Toyota Atlantic years

Patrick Carpentier started into Formula Ford 2000 Canada, before moving up to Player's Toyota Atlantic Championship in 1992. He joined Lynx Racing in 1995, whereby he won his first-ever race for the team around the streets of Bicentennial Park (Miami). He won again on the Nazareth Speedway oval, however the remainder of the season was marked by a variety of mechanical problems.

1996 was a whole different story. During the course of the Player's Toyota Atlantic Championship, he would shatter every record in the 25-year history of the championship, including nine wins out of 12 races – eight of them in a row, from pole position. He rewrote the record book for this series, setting a new record for the most consecutive wins(8), most wins in a season (9), also most consecutive wins from pole (8), most laps led in a season and most accumulated points in a season (239pts).  This included a flag-to-flag victory at the Grand Prix Molson du Canada meeting. After shattering Gilles Villeneuve's long standing records, his 1996 Atlantic season propelled him to the major league Indycar series.

IndyCar career
After winning the 1996 Player's Toyota Atlantic Championship, Carpentier won a ride with Bettenhausen/Alumax team in CART, defeating several veteran racers from across the US and Europe, in a test held at Sebring. He debuted in CART in 1997 with Bettenhausen/Alumax team. In that first season, he was on pole at Nazareth, with a best finish was second at the inaugural race at Gateway, the Motorola 300. He would also be crowned "Rookie of the Year".

In 1998, he started driving for Player's Forsythe Racing, when the team expanded their operations to run a second alongside fellow Canadian, Greg Moore. At the end of the following season, with the unfortunate death of Moore, in season finale, the Marlboro 500 at Fontana, Carpentier became Forsythe's number one, when rookie Alex Tagliani was brought into the squad, keeping it an all-Canadian affair. In his early years he was prone to missing races through injuries, some of which originated off-track.

His first Champ Car victory came in 2001 in the Harrah's 500, at the Michigan International Speedway, and would finish tenth in the overall end of year standing. In what was the last CART sanctioned Michigan 500, he seized victory with a dramatic last-lap pass of Dario Franchitti. For Carpentier, this first CART win finally arrived in his 79th start. The following season, he would win twice, Marconi Grand Prix of Cleveland, and Grand Prix of Mid-Ohio and would take third in the championship standing. Carpentier was 5th overall in a disappointing 2003 season, despite winning the Grand Prix of Monterey, at the Laguna Seca (compared to title-winning teammate Paul Tracy).

Tracy's performance weakened Carpentier's position within the team and rumours circulating pre-2004 season suggesting Carpentier would be dropped by Forsythe Racing, in favour of Rodolfo Lavin. Instead, Gerald Forsythe decided to run a third car for Lavin. Allegedly, Patrick kept his ride because of his marketing popularity in his homeland. He would repay Forsythe by retaining the Grand Prix of Monterey. Despite finishing higher than Paul Tracy in the 2004 championship, Carpentier left the team and the series for the 2005 season, joining Eddie Cheever's Cheever Racing in the IndyCar Series. Due to his excellent record on oval tracks he was expected to do well (most of the IndyCar Series races are on ovals which had become virtually extinct in Champ Car), but uncompetitive Toyota engines prevented any major success. He ended 10th in the standings with two third places and 11 top 10s out of 17 races.

The 2005 season would be Carpentier's last in open-wheel competition. In a 2016 interview, the Canadian acknowledged he had decided to retire after seeing Ryan Briscoe's crash into the catchfence at the Chicagoland race; other major IRL crashes like the one suffered by Kenny Bräck in the 2003 finale at Texas also played a role in his decision. In his nine years as a competitor in CART and IRL's IndyCar, Carpentier finished in the top 10 85 times, and stood on the podium 24 times.

Sports car career

Shortly after the end of his IndyCar career, Carpentier drove a Crawford-Lexus DP03 for former boss Eddie Cheever in the 2006 Rolex 24 at Daytona. He then competed in the 2006 CASCAR Super Series event at Cayuga Speedway. Carpentier started 21st in the Dave Jacobs Racing car and finished sixth. From there he tried his hand at Grand-Am Road Racing, running a partial season with SAMAX Motorsport piloting their Riley Mk XI. 

He re-signed for another season with SAMAX, to drive a Daytona Prototype in the 2007 Grand-Am Rolex Sports Car Series, alongside either Milka Duno or Ryan Dalziel. The highlight of this partnership was their second place in the Rolex 24 at Daytona. The trio also shared their Riley-Pontiac Mk XI with another British driver, Darren Manning. They finished on the same lap as the winner, just 75.845 seconds behind after 24 hours of racing, leading for 121 of the 668 laps. Carpentier last race for SAMAX was the 400 km Montreal, where he finished 10th, partnered by Kris Szekeres, took place on August 3, 2007. He later left SAMAX to pursue a career in NASCAR, with his first race (the NAPA Auto Parts 200) the next day.

Stock car career

Carpentier made his debut in the NASCAR Busch Series at Montreal's Circuit Gilles Villeneuve on August 4, 2007, taking pole in qualifying and finished the controversial race in 2nd place, behind Kevin Harvick, while Robby Gordon was disqualified by NASCAR from his first place spot for intentionally wrecking Marcos Ambrose and ignoring a resulting penalty. Carpentier would return to Montreal to post another 2nd place in 2008. Carpentier made his NASCAR Nextel Cup debut on August 12, 2007, at Watkins Glen, in the Gillett Evernham Motorsports #10 Valvoline/Stanley Tools-sponsored Dodge, replacing Scott Riggs and started 40th.  Carpentier led for seven laps in the race near the midway portion of the race and wound up finishing in the 20th position. In October 2007, it was announced he would drive the #10 car full-time in 2008.

On February 14, 2008, Carpentier attempted to qualify for the 2008 Daytona 500 in the second of two Gatorade Duels. Carpentier ran in the top 10 for most of the day. Late in the race, his right front tire blew, sending him into the backstretch wall. Carpentier was running in third place of the drivers not locked into the Daytona 500 based on owner points.

The Joliette driver had not seen New Hampshire Motor Speedway before visiting for track for the 2008 Lenox Industrial Tools 301. On June 27, 2008, in just his 17th NASCAR race, he became only the second non-American driver to qualify on pole. He was the first by a foreign born in NASCAR's top division since Lloyd Shaw (from Toronto, Ontario, Canada) won the pole at Langhorne Speedway in June 1953. Come race day, he didn't give up the lead easily as he led the first four laps. "That was a heck of a thrill," Carpentier said after the race. "Winning the pole on Friday was certainly a highlight of my career. But leading those laps was unbelievable. It's hard to put into words." He would later be hit by brakes problems and would finish down in 31st place.

On July 5, 2008, Carpentier earned his best career Sprint Cup finish by finishing 14th in the Coke Zero 400.

On August 30, 2008, Carpentier announced that he would be a free agent for the 2009 Sprint Cup Series, leaving Gillett Evernham Motorsports. Four days prior to Carpentier's announcement Gillett Evernham Motorsports had announced that they would hire driver Reed Sorenson for 2009 making Carpentier's future uncertain. On October 7, Carpentier was released by GEM. Former Team Red Bull driver A. J. Allmendinger finished out the year.

On June 9, 2009, Michael Waltrip Racing announced that Carpentier would replace team owner, Michael Waltrip in the No. 55 NAPA-sponsored Toyota for the two road course races on the 2009 Sprint Cup schedule: Infineon on June 21 and Watkins Glen on August 9. Carpentier competed in a number of races for Tommy Baldwin Racing in events that conflict with Mike Skinner's truck series schedule.

In 2010, Carpentier ran a number of races for Latitude 43 Motorsports. In 2011, Carpentier returned to his open-wheel roots, attempting to qualify for the 95th Indianapolis 500 for Dragon Racing after former Red Bull driver Scott Speed was unable to get the car up to speed on bump day. Carpentier was unable to get the car in the race. On the stock car side, Carpentier drove a few Sprint Cup races for Frank Stoddard's team. On June 7, Carpentier announced to the Toronto Sun that he would officially retire from racing after the NAPA Auto Parts 200 at Circuit Gilles Villeneuve, where he drove for Pastrana-Waltrip Racing.

On April 22, 2016, Carpentier announced he would return to the Cup Series starting with the Toyota/Save Mart 350 at Sonoma, followed by also competing in the Brickyard 400 at Indy for Go FAS Racing. Piloting the No.32  Can-Am Kappa, Cyclops Ford Fusion Carpentier was the only road course ringer in the race at Sonoma. A promising day went wrong when Carpentier blew a tire while running 11th with less than 15 laps to go, resulting in a 37th-place finish. Carpentier would steal the headlines during practice for the 2016 Brickyard 400 when he got into an accident with Kyle Busch. Carpentier would finish 34th in the race, his best finish of the season.

Retirement
On August 20, 2011, Carpentier announced his retirement shortly before the Nationwide race in Montreal. While running fourth, contact with Steven Wallace took him out of the race and he left to a standing ovation from the crowd.

Despite his retirement, Carpentier stated in January 2012 that he would be willing to compete in the Montreal Nationwide Series race in 2012, to raise money for children's charities. After starting 13th, Carpentier finished 29th.

In 2013, after spending time trying to avoid racing, Carpentier joined the French-language sports channel RDS, as a colour commentator for their NASCAR broadcasts. After retiring from full-time racing in 2008, Patrick said that he “tried other things but I need to be around racing. Everything has been very different since I stopped racing and I have been trying to come to grips with it.” Prior to this, Carpentier was in the home renovation business, buying and selling real estate in Nevada, where he lived whilst an active racer. As the economic downturn hit the Las Vegas region hard and real estate prices started to sag, this made life difficult for him. So when RDS offer came along, he took up their offer.

When in August 2014, the inaugural World Rallycross Championship hit the classic Canadian street venue, Circuit Trois-Rivières, the seventh round of the season. Carpentier was the chance to make his rallycross debut with the Volkswagen Marklund Motorsport outfit. Despite his lack of experience of Rallycross cars, he raced through the heats, qualifying for the Final. At the start of the final, Carpentier slotted his Volkswagen Polo in fourth place behind Timur Timerzyanov. He was the first driver to take his joker lap, but spun at the end of the second lap, putting him out of contention for a podium finish. By lap four, much to the dismay of the crowd, Carpentier crashed out, leaving him classified sixth overall in the first ever World RX of Canada event. The event was won by Petter Solberg, from Anton Marklund. Carpentier raced a JRM Racing Mini Countryman in the 2015 World RX of Canada, this time finishing 14th overall and failing to reach the semi-finals.

Carpentier was inducted into the Canadian Motorsport Hall of Fame in 2021.

Racing record

Career highlights

Complete 24 Hours of Daytona results

American open–wheel racing results
(key) (Races in bold indicate pole position) (Races in italics indicate fastest lap)

Indy Lights

CART/Champ Car

 ^ New points system introduced in 2004.

IndyCar

 1 The Las Vegas Indy 300 was abandoned after Dan Wheldon died from injuries sustained in a 15-car crash on lap 11.

Indy 500 results

International open-wheel racing

A1 Grand Prix
(Races in bold indicate pole position) (Races in italics indicate fastest lap)

NASCAR
(key) (Bold – Pole position awarded by qualifying time. Italics – Pole position earned by points standings or practice time. * – Most laps led.)

Sprint Cup Series

Daytona 500

Nationwide Series

Craftsman Truck Series

Complete FIA World Rallycross Championship results

Supercar

See also
 List of Canadians in Champ Car
 List of Canadians in NASCAR

References

External links

 
 Construction Patrick Carpentier Inc.
 ESPN:Tailing Patrick Carpentier Day 1, in 2007
 ESPN:Tailing Patrick Carpentier Day 2
 ESPN:Tailing Patrick Carpentier Day 3

1971 births
Living people
Canadian people of French descent
French Quebecers
People from LaSalle, Quebec
Racing drivers from Quebec
Sportspeople from Montreal
24 Hours of Daytona drivers
Indianapolis 500 drivers
NASCAR drivers
IndyCar Series drivers
Champ Car drivers
Indy Lights drivers
Atlantic Championship drivers
A1 Team Canada drivers
Rolex Sports Car Series drivers
World Rallycross Championship drivers
Evernham Motorsports drivers
Dragon Racing drivers
A1 Grand Prix drivers
Bettenhausen Racing drivers
Forsythe Racing drivers
Cheever Racing drivers
Michael Waltrip Racing drivers